Acacia stricta (hop wattle, straight wattle) is a perennial tree. The plant is adaptable to most soils, tolerating full sun or partial to complete shade. Tolerates drought conditions and moderately salty winds. The shrub is useful in planting, as it is not too dense and can be used for screening other plants. The plant grows up to 2-4m depending on conditions.

See also
Penambol Conservation Park

References 

stricta
Flora of Victoria (Australia)
Fabales of Australia
Taxa named by Henry Cranke Andrews